James Lawrence Hogeboom (August 25, 1766 Ghent, Columbia County, New York – December 23, 1839 Castleton-on-Hudson, Rensselaer County, New York) was an American merchant, lawyer and politician from New York.

Life
He was the son of Lawrence Hogeboom (1737–1805, member of the New York State Assembly in 1786 and 1792) and Hester (Leggett) Hogeboom (1739–1832).

Hogeboom removed to Pittstown, New York, in 1794. He married Mary Van Alstyne, and they had several children, among them Dr. James Hogeboom (1800–1870). He removed to Castleton-on-Hudson, New York, in April 1802.

He was a member of the New York State Assembly in 1804-05 and 1808. He was First Judge of the Rensselaer County Court from 1805 to 1808. He was a delegate to the New York State Constitutional Convention of 1821.

Hogeboom was elected as a Crawford Democratic-Republican to the 18th United States Congress, holding office from March 4, 1823 to March 3, 1825. Afterwards he resumed his mercantile business.

He was buried at Castleton Cemetery.

External links

The New York Civil List compiled by Franklin Benjamin Hough (pages 57, 71, 178, 181, 281 and 363; Weed, Parsons and Co., 1858)
Hogeboom genealogy at GenForum

1766 births
1839 deaths
American people of Dutch descent
Members of the New York State Assembly
People from Ghent, New York
People from Schodack, New York
New York (state) state court judges
Democratic-Republican Party members of the United States House of Representatives from New York (state)
People from Pittstown, New York